Lime Rock is a ghost town in Outagamie County, Wisconsin, United States. Once located in the town of Seymour and the town of Osborn, the ghost town has no surviving buildings.

Geography
Lime Rock was located at  (44.500978, -88.351047), with an elevation of 851 feet (259m).

References

Ghost towns in Wisconsin
Geography of Outagamie County, Wisconsin